Blanda, and later Blanda Julia, was an ancient city of Lucania, mentioned by Ptolemy among the inland towns of that province; but placed both by Pliny and Mela on or near the coast of the Tyrrhenian Sea. The former writer includes it in Bruttium, but this seems to be a mistake: Livy, who mentions Blanda among the towns which had revolted to the Carthaginians, but were recovered by Fabius in 214 BCE, expressly calls it a Lucanian city. (Liv. xiv. 20; Plin. iii. 5. s. 10; Mel. ii. 4; Ptol. iii. 1. § 70.) The Tabula Peutingeriana also places it on the road along the coast of Lucania. The ruins of Blanda form a major archaeological site at Palecastro di Tortora in the comune of Tortora, Province of Cosenza, Calabria, Italy.

References

Tortora's official website

Bruttium
Lucania
Archaeological sites in Calabria
Pre-Roman cities in Italy
Ruins in Italy
Former populated places in Italy